"Generals and Majors" is a song written by Colin Moulding of the English rock band XTC, released as the first single from their 1980 album Black Sea. Moulding accordingly wrote the song as a satirical take on the phrase "oh, what a lovely war". The song charted in the UK single chart at No. 32 and No. 104 on the US singles chart, while reaching No. 28 on Billboard's Album Rock Tracks chart. It was the first XTC single to chart in the U.S., and it also had chart success in Canada, Australia and New Zealand.

The track was initially released as a double 7" single with a gatefold sleeve, limited to 15,000 copies. The additional record featured Moulding's "Smokeless Zone" and Partridge's "The Somnambulist".

Music video
The music video shows the band playing servers and a group of men in military uniforms; one of them is Richard Branson, driving a Go-kart and jumping on a bouncy castle. According to Andy Partridge, Branson appeared "because he's a complete publicity hog. He decided he was gonna turn up and keep suggesting that he be in the video. That is the worst video ever made by man."

Personnel
XTC
Andy Partridge
Colin Moulding
Dave Gregory
Terry Chambers

Charts

See also
 List of anti-war songs

References

External links
 Discogs entry
 "Generals and Majors" on Chalkhills

XTC songs
1980 songs
1980 singles
Virgin Records singles
Songs written by Colin Moulding
Satirical songs
Anti-war songs
Song recordings produced by Steve Lillywhite